Sukoharjo Regency is a regency in the Central Java province in Indonesia. It covers an area of 466.77 km2 and had a population of 824,238 at the 2010 Census and 907,587 at the 2020 Census. Its capital is Sukoharjo, about 10 km south from Surakarta. This regency is bordered by the city of Surakarta in the north, Karanganyar Regency in the east, Wonogiri Regency and Yogyakarta in the south as well as Klaten Regency in the west. The regency is part of the metropolitan zone of Surakarta, which is known as Subosukawonosraten.

Geography 

Bengawan Solo "divides" this regency into two parts. The northern part is commonly lowland and wavy, forming the catchment area of Surakarta city. while the southern part is mountainous.

Near the northern border are the developmental areas surrounding Surakarta City such as Grogol and Kartosuro, which lie within the metropolitan area of that city. Kartosuro is the junction of the Solo-Yogyakarta track with Solo-Semarang. 

Sukoharjo Regency is crossed by the Solo-Wonogiri railway, which re-operated in 2004 after being unused for many years. This railway is one of the most "dangerous" ones in  Indonesia because it is located beside the main road without any barrier.

Climate
Sukoharjo has a tropical monsoon climate (Am) with moderate to little rainfall from June to October and heavy rainfall from November to May. The following climate data is for the city of Sukoharjo.

Administrative districts
Sukoharjo Regency is divided into twelve districts (kecamatan), tabulated below with their areas and their populations at the 2010 Census and the 2020 Census. The table also includes the number of administrative villages (rural desa and urban keluraham) in each district and its post code.

Note: (a) except for the village of Mranggen, which has a post code of 57513.

The districts are subdivided into 167 desa and kelurahan. The administrative center is located in Sukoharjo.

References

External links 

 

Regencies of Central Java
Solo River